David Fishman is an American academic and author. He is a professor of Jewish History at the Jewish Theological Seminary of America.

Fishman's 2017 book, The Book Smugglers: Partisans, Poets, and the Race to Save Jewish Treasures from the Nazis, won the 2017 National Jewish Book Award, in the Holocaust category. The Book Smugglers explores the desperate, clandestine effort to preserve rare Jewish books from destruction by the Nazis during the Holocaust.

Biography
Fishman is the son of the linguist Joshua Fishman.

After graduating from Yeshiva University with an AB, Fishman earned a PhD at Harvard University.

Bibliography

Books
The Book Smugglers: Partisans, Poets, and the Race to Save Jewish Treasures from the Nazis, (ForeEdge, 2017) 
 Russia's First Modern Jews, (New York University Press, 1996) 
The Rise of Modern Yiddish Culture, (University of Pittsburgh Press, 2005).

Edited volumes
From Mesopotamia to Modernity: Ten Introductions to Jewish History and Literature, co-editor with Burton Visotzky,  (Westview Press, 1999), 
Droshes un ksovim, a volume of Rabbi Joseph B. Soloveitchik's Yiddish writings,  (Ktav, 2009).

References

External links
 Q&A: Remembering The Writers Who Defied The Nazis To Save Jewish Texts, by Talya Zax,9 January 2018, The Forward

Jewish Theological Seminary of America faculty
Yeshiva University alumni
Harvard University alumni
Year of birth missing (living people)
Living people
American male non-fiction writers